The 68th Infantry Division (68-ya Pekhotnaya Diviziya) was a reserve infantry formation of the Russian Imperial Army. It was mobilized twice, in 1904–1905 for the Russo-Japanese War and in 1914–1918 for World War I.

Organization
1st Brigade
269th Infantry Regiment
270th Infantry Regiment
2nd Brigade
271st Infantry Regiment
272nd Infantry Regiment

References

Infantry divisions of the Russian Empire